Quint-Fonsegrives is a commune in the Haute-Garonne department in southwestern France.

Population
The inhabitants of the commune are known as Quintfonsegrivois in French.

Twin towns
In 15 November 2010, Quint-Fonsegrives became the twin town of Leiria in Portugal.

See also
Communes of the Haute-Garonne department

References

External links

Official site

Communes of Haute-Garonne